Kryk Dushi (translation: Scream of the soul) is one of the most successful and popular Ukrainian rock bands of "New generation". It was formed in 2007 in Rivne, Ukraine.

Current members 

 Ivan Luk'yanchuk — vocal (2007–present)
 Vasylʹ Petrenko — guitar (2007–present)
 Kostyantyn Kavylin — bass (2007–present)
 Svyatoslav Rohashko — piano, synthesizers (2007–present)

Discography

Albums 
 2009 - Nenarodzhenyy (Ненароджений - Unborn)
 2011 - People (Люди - People)
 2012 - A svit tak i ne navchyvsya lyubyty... (А світ так і не навчився любити...)

External links
 Official Okean Elzy website
 YouTube
 Twitter

Musical groups established in 2007
Ukrainian rock music groups